The Royal Society Africa Prize  (formerly known as the Royal Society Pfizer Prize) has been awarded by the Royal Society since 2006 to African-based researchers at the start of their career who are making innovative contributions to the biological sciences in Africa. £60,000 is awarded as a grant for the recipient to carry out a research project that is linked to an African centre of scientific excellence, normally a University or equivalent research centre, and a further £5,000 is given directly to the prizewinner.

The final award under the Pfizer name was made in 2016, after which the award was renamed the Royal Society Africa Prize, and consists of a grant of £11,000 and a gift of £1000.

Recipients 
Source: Royal Society
 Royal Society Pfizer Prize
 2006: Alexis Nzila
 2007: Hiba Mohamed, for her pioneering research into genetic susceptibility to leishmaniasis, a parasitic disease transmitted by sand fly bites
 2008: Enock Matovu
 2009: Linda-Gail Bekker, director of the Desmond Tutu HIV Centre, for her outstanding research into tuberculosis and HIV co-infections in Africa
 2010: Collins Ouma of Maseno University, for his outstanding research into the effect of genetic variation in severe malarial anaemia (SMA) in children.
 2011: Julie Makani of the Nuffield Department of Clinical Medicine and Muhimbili University, Tanzania, for her outstanding research into using anaemia in sickle cell disease as a model for translating genetic research into health benefits
 2012: Martin Ota, for his outstanding research into the relationship of pneumococcal protein antibody levels to nasopharyngeal carriage of pneumococci in early infancy.
 2013: Abdoulaye Diabate, for his important work on the identification of mosquito swarming cues
 2014: Faith Osier, for her research on understanding the mechanisms of immunity to malaria infection in man
 2015: Gordon A Awandare, for his achievements in molecular and cellular studies of malaria, including how malaria parasites invade red blood cells and cause disease and Jean-Jacques Muyembe-Tamfum, for his seminal work on viral haemorrhagic fevers, including Ebola, generating the foundation of our understanding of the epidemiology, clinical manifestations and control of outbreaks of these viral infections.
 2016: Amina Abubakar, for her pioneering psychological research in East Africa and her work developing neurodevelopmental assessments.

 Royal Society Africa Prize
 2017: Allasane Dicko for his contribution to research into malaria control
 2018: Dorothy Yeboah-Manu or her contributions and innovative approaches to understanding Mycobacterium ulcerans and Mycobacterium africanum
 2019: Henry Mwandumba for his novel work in description of the TB phagosome in HIV infected alveolar macrophages and his leadership in the College of Medicine in Malawi
 2020: Steven Runo for elucidating pathways for long distance RNA trafficking between parasitic plants and their hosts and identifying and developing transgenic protocol for characterizing and validating candidate host and parasite genes.
 2021: George Warimwe for his work on zoonoses vaccine development, capacity building in Africa, and his innovative research proposal
 2022: Novel Njweipi Chegou for his work in the fields of pulmonary and extrapulmonary tuberculosis, and his innovative project proposal.

See also 
 List of biology awards

References 

Awards established in 2006
Awards of the Royal Society
Biology awards
2006 in science
Early career awards